Chan Sze Wing (born 23 March 1983 in Hong Kong), is a former Hong Kong footballer who last played for Hong Kong First Division League club Tai Po as a left back and a left midfielder.

Club career 
Chan joined the Hong Kong Sports Institute when he was studying at primary 6. However, the Hong Kong Sports Institute was dissolved four years later. He decided to join Orient & Yee Hope Union. Two years later, he joined Rangers. At first, he only got chances at the reserves team. In 2000, he was promoted to the first team.

In 2001, Chan decided to play for South China reserves, only as a part-time player.

Two years later, Chan transferred to Third Division League club Tai Po. He helped Tai Po to promote to the Hong Kong First Division League. However, even the team was competing at Hong Kong First Division League, he was still a part-time player.

On 6 June 2009, he helped Tai Po to win the Hong Kong FA Cup, after beating TSW Pegasus. He said that it was very difficult to play as a part-time player. He said that his family's support was a great power to continue his football career.

Playing Style 
Chan has a very high speed. Therefore, he can play as a left midfielder or left wing as well. He also plays long balls very well.

References 

Living people
Association football forwards
Hong Kong footballers
Hong Kong First Division League players
Tai Po FC players
South China AA players
Hong Kong Rangers FC players
1983 births